Jay Pitts (born 9 December 1989) is an English professional rugby league footballer who plays as a  or  for Wakefield Trinity in the Betfred Super League.

He previously played for the Wakefield Trinity Wildcats, Leeds Rhinos, Hull FC and the Bradford Bulls in the Super League, and the London Broncos in the Championship and the top flight.

Background
Pitts was born in Ossett, West Yorkshire, England.

Playing career
He has also played at club level for the Bradford Bulls (Heritage No.), Wakefield Trinity Wildcats (Heritage No. 1261), Leeds Rhinos  (Heritage No.) and Hull F.C. (Heritage No.).

Pitts signed a contract with Leeds beginning at the end of the 2009 season.

In March 2012, Pitts signed a -year deal with Hull F.C. after they negotiated a deal with Leeds.

Bradford Bulls
2014 - 2014 Season

Pitts featured in Round 11 (Warrington) to Round 15 (Wakefield Trinity Wildcats). Pitts then played in Round 17 (Hull Kingston Rovers) to Round 27 (London Broncos). In the Challenge Cup he featured in Round 5 (Catalans Dragons) to the Quarter Final against Warrington.

2015 - 2015 Season

Pitts signed for Bradford on a permanent basis on a two-year deal. He featured in the pre-season friendlies against Castleford and Leeds.

He featured in Round 1 (Leigh Centurions) to Round 23 (Halifax). Pitts played in Qualifier 1 (Sheffield) to Qualifier 7 (Halifax). Pitts played in the £1 Million Game (Wakefield Trinity Wildcats). He also featured in the Challenge Cup in Round 4 (Workington Town) to Round 5 (Hull Kingston Rovers).

2016 - 2016 Season

Pitts featured in the pre-season friendlies against Leeds and Castleford.

He featured in Round 1 (Featherstone Rovers) to Round 21 (Whitehaven) then in Round 23 (Featherstone Rovers). Pitts played in the Championship Shield Game 1 (Whitehaven) to the Final against (Sheffield). Pitts played in the Challenge Cup in the 4th Round against (Dewsbury).

London Broncos

Pitts signed a two-year deal with London following Bradford's liquidation.

2017 - 2017 Season

Pitts featured in Round 1 (Swinton Lions) to Round 7 (Rochdale Hornets). He also played in the Challenge Cup in Round 4 (Toronto Wolfpack). He scored against Rochdale Hornets (1 try).

Wakefield Trinity
In 2020, Pitts joined Wakefield Trinity from the London Broncos.

Statistics
Statistics do not include pre-season friendlies.

References

External links

London Broncos profile
London Broncos coaching profile
SL profile

1989 births
Living people
Bradford Bulls players
English rugby league players
Hull F.C. players
Leeds Rhinos players
London Broncos captains
London Broncos players
People from Ossett
Rugby league locks
Rugby league players from Wakefield
Rugby league props
Rugby league second-rows
Wakefield Trinity players